Baldr Force is a 2D action-shooter game and eroge visual novel with fast action and detailed sprite characters. The game features a world in the not-so-distant future where humans are able to dive into the network, and fight using humanoid tools called "Simulacrum".

Baldr Force EXE
Baldr Force EXE adds the following:
Bald hell mode
New weapon: gravity field
Super easy mode
Bald checker 1/2 data

The Dreamcast and PlayStation 2 versions removed the adult only scenes.

The PS2 version has a new voice casting, a new theme song, a new opening movie and a new cutscene. Hyper mode and time attack mode were also added to this version.

The Premium pack version, available at the PlayStation 2's rerelease, includes a mech figure. The Dreamcast Sega Direct online shop rerelease came with a Telephone card, poster and mech figure.

Baldr Force "Standard Edition"
It is the PC port of the PlayStation 2 version. However, the title song is still based on the original Windows games. It includes enhanced visuals.

An early order includes a full remake of the soundtrack CD.

Plot
As a hacker of the renowned hacking group "Steppenwolf",  and his partners earn their living by hacking into servers and selling the information they steal.

As the last hacking before disbanding their group, they hacked into a military server, but soon they find this is a setup by the military to lure terrorists, and they were drawn into battle between two factions. At the end, one of Tōru Sōma's friends was killed by an unknown Simulacrum, while most other group members have been arrested. To investigate and avenge his friend's death, Tōru accepted the offer to join the military.

Characters

Steppenwolf

FLAK

Fei Dao

Others

OVA

An OVA based on the game entitled, "BALDR FORCE EXE Resolution" was released on October 11, 2006. The OVA consists of 4 episodes and was directed by Takashi Yamazaki. Funimation licensed the OVA for North American distribution on July 21, 2007, and it was released on May 20, 2008, including all 4 episodes on one DVD. Funimation released the OVA under the name Baldr Force EXE, dropping "Resolution" from the title. The OVA's opening theme is "Face of Fact (Resolution Ver.)" by Kotoko, and the ending theme is "Undelete" by Mami Kawada.

Plot
An entire world exists unseen, a world that can be accessed only by the mind ... the Wired World. A place of freedom. And occasionally a place of death.

Tōru Sōma knows the land of the logged-in well, for he and his fearless gang of hackers once had the run of the place. But as tragedy came to call and the group disbanded, he was forced to join the ranks of FLAK; a military organization charged with protecting the hidden data paradise deep within the vast network of servers. Indentured into service and out for revenge, Tōru cannot let go of the dead of the past even as a ghost of the present takes shape.

Tōru with the loneliness and confusion of being trapped between two worlds, there is only one question ... What is reality?

Baldr Force Re-Action
It is a game included with Xross Scramble, which uses Baldr Force characters.

Reception 
Helen McCarthy put "BALDR FORCE EXE Resolution" into the book 500 Essential Anime Movies and stated that "the story is simple, but has plenty of well crafted CGI action".

See also
Baldr Sky

References

External links
 Giga game page 
 Alchemist game page  
 BALDR FORCE Standard Edition game page 
 BALDR FORCE EXE Resolution OVA homepage (archive) 
 Funimation's Baldr Force EXE website
 
 

2002 video games
2006 anime OVAs
Bishōjo games
Dreamcast games
Eroge
Funimation
Japan-exclusive video games
Mecha anime and manga
PlayStation 2 games
Satelight
Video games about terrorism
Video games developed in Japan
Visual novels
Windows games
Single-player video games
Alchemist (company) games